Malek Chebel (1953 – 12 November 2016) was a notable Algerian philosopher and anthropologist of religions . He was one of the most prominent North African intellectuals. He studied in Algeria, then later in France at Paris where he also studied psychoanalysis. He was a teacher at many universities worldwide.

Essayist, author of books specialized in Arab world and Islam, he created the expression: “Islam of lights”. He spoke at numerous conferences in Europe and Africa.

He is known for his reflections about Islam, its culture, its history, intellectual life. He is also famous for his public positions for a liberal Islam, and for its reform. His famous works include 'The Manifesto for an Enlightened Islam'.

Biography 
Born in 1953 at Philippeville, now Skikda in Algeria, Chebel pursued his primary and secondary studies there and obtained his baccalaureate in philosophy and Arab letters. He entered the university of Ain El Bay (Constantine) in 1977, then he went to France to pursue his university studies. In 1980, he obtained a first degree in clinical psychopathology and psychoanalysis from Paris 7 University.

Then, in 1982, Chebel obtained his doctorate of anthropology, ethnology and science of religions at Jussieu, and in 1984, he earned a doctorate in political science at the Paris Institute of Political Studies. He worked at the research direction at the Sorbonne. He worked and gave conferences in Europe, in the Arab world and in America.

His thoughts 
The prolific work of Malek Chebel with his vast experience as a historian, psychoanalyst and anthropologist is mainly devoted to the defense of freedom in all its forms: political freedom, freedom of thought, freedom to live and love and its place in Islam and Muslim culture. Freedom guides his reflection about the body, desire, love, relations between men and women, but also about tolerance, politic engagement, and generosity. He called for the end of violence (in all its forms).

He prefaced several books including the translation of Quran made by Edouard Montet. He died of cancer on 12 November 2016.

Islam and Occident 
His work Islam and Free Will aims to understand Islam and its relation with the Occident. Understanding the ways of thinking, of living, the sensibilities of the other to go beyond hatred, giving him a place in this world. It is also an interrogation about the place of freedom in Islam, and an invitation for new research on Islam and its traditions.
He called for a return to the original tenets of Islam to combat fundamental Islamism.
“The majority of Muslims are caught between two groups: on the one hand a small group of violent Muslims who want to Islamize the world; and on the other hand the majority of the Western people who don’t understand Islam”.

He reminds us that Islam is plural and alive. He also reminds us that in the past, Islam has been innovative in a lot of aspects of life. He analyzed the evolution and mutations of mentalities in the Muslim world. Chebel affirmed that through the centuries, there were a great periods of peace, creativity and happiness along with periods of brutal violence. He states, “It in the name of these centuries that I work; in the name of many scientists, writers, grammarians, jurists, doctors that I speak."

Works 
 1984 : Le corps en Islam, Éd. PUF, coll. Quadrige 2e éd. 1999, 3e éd. 2004 
 1986 : La formation de l'identité politique, Éd. PUF, Éd. Payot 2e éd. 1997 
 1986 : Le livre des séductions suivi de Dix Aphorismes sur l'amour, Lieu commun, Éd. Payot 2e éd. 1997 
 1988 : L'Esprit de sérail, mythes et pratiques sexuelles au Maghreb, Lieu commun, Éd. Payot 2e éd. 1997 
 1992 : Histoire de la circoncision des origines à nos jours, Éd. Balland, 2e éd. 1997, Éd. Perrin 3e éd. 2006 
 1993 : L'imaginaire arabo-musulman, Éd. PUF, 2e éd. coll. Quadrige 2002 
 1995 : Dictionnaire des symboles musulmans, Éd. Albin Michel, 2e éd. 2001 
 1995 : Encyclopédie de l'amour en Islam. Érotisme, beauté et sexualité dans le monde arabe, en Perse et en Turquie, Éd. Payot, 2e éd. 2003 
 1996 : Psychanalyse des Mille et Une Nuits, Éd. Payot, 2e éd. 2002 
 1997 : Les symboles de l'Islam, album, Éd. Assouline, 2e éd. 1999 
 1998 : Préface de Coran, Traduit par Edouard Montet, Éd. Payot-Poche, 2e éd. 2001 
 1999 : Traité du raffinement, Éd. Payot, 2e éd. en poche 2008 
 2000 : Du Désir, Éd. Payot, 2e éd. 2002 
 2001 : Les cent noms de l'amour, avec Lassad Metoui, Éd. Alternatives, 2e éd. 2003 
 2002 : Mahomet et l'Islam, Illustré par Yves Beaujard, Casterman 
 2002 : Le Sujet en Islam, Éd. du Seuil 
 2003 : Islam et Libre arbitre, la tentation de l'insolence, avec Marie de Solemne, Éd. Dervy 
 2004 : Dictionnaire amoureux de l'islam, Éd. Plon, coll. « Dictionnaire amoureux »
 2004 : Manifeste pour un islam des lumières. 27 propositions pour réformer l'islam, Éd. Hachette Littératures 
 2004 : Anthologie du vin et de l'ivresse, Éd. du Seuil, 2e éd. Pauvert 2008 
 2005 : Préface de L'islam, passion française. Une anthologie, Bartillat 
 2005 : L'islam et la raison, le combat des idées, Perrin, 2e éd. Tempus 2006 
 2006 : Le Kama sutra arabe, 2000 ans de littérature érotique en Orient, Pauvert 
 2006 : Le Coran raconté aux enfants, Illustré par Mimi des Bois, Petit Phare 
 2007 : L'Islam expliqué, Perrin 
 2007 : Treize contes du Coran et de l'Islam, Fayard 
 2007 : L'esclavage en terre d'islam Fayard 
 2007 : Ouvrage collectif Prières d'Islam. Ce que les hommes disent aux Dieux, Éd. du Seuil, p. 209-272
 2008 : Le Coran pour les Nuls, avec Sohaib Sultan, Éd. Broché 
 2008 : L'Islam pour les Nuls, avec Malcolm Clark, Éd. Broché 
 2008 : Anthologie du vin et de l'ivresse en Islam, Pauvert 
 2009 : Sagesses d'Islam, Éd. First 
 2009 : Coran (nouvelle traduction), Fayard 
 2009 : Dictionnaire encyclopédique du Coran, Fayard 
 2011 : Les grandes figures de l'Islam, Librairie Académique Perrin 
 2011 : Les Enfants d'Abraham. Un chrétien, un juif et un musulman dialoguent, avec Alain de La Morandais, Haïm Korsia, Presses de la Renaissance 
 2012 : Dictionnaire amoureux de l'Algérie, Plon 
 2014 : L’érotisme arabe, Bouquins 
 2015 : L'inconscient de l'islam : Réflexions sur l'interdit, la faute et la transgression, CNRS,

References

1953 births
2016 deaths
Algerian Muslims
People from Skikda
Sciences Po alumni
Algerian philosophers
Islamic philosophers
Deaths from cancer in France
21st-century Algerian people